Frank R. Davis (January 29, 1953 – January 22, 2008) was an American serial killer who raped and murdered three teenage boys in Indiana between 1971 and 1983.

Early life 
While at a juvenile detention center, Davis was sexually abused by one of the attendants and at least one other inmate. The courts later said the attack that Davis suffered from the fellow inmate was similar to how he assaulted one of his victims.

Murders 
On January 10, 1983, Davis confronted a 15-year-old boy at gunpoint, wrapped a wire around his neck, then forced him to perform oral sex. He then pistol-whipped him unconscious. The boy would recover from the attack and identify Davis.

On June 16, 1983, Davis confronted 14-year-old Darrin Reed at knifepoint after the two shared a beer. Davis wrapped a wire around Reed's neck, performed oral sex on him, and then strangled him to death.

On June 18, 1983, two 15-year-old boys, including one named Jeff Lopez, were camping when they saw Davis in the woods. Davis was smoking marijuana and shared it with the teenagers. Afterwards, he waited for them to go to sleep. Davis then went into their tent, woke up Lopez, and moved him into the woods at knifepoint. He restrained the boy with wire, performed oral sex on him, and then strangled him to death with the wire. He then returned to the other boy, tied him up with wire, and performed oral sex on him, before striking him in the head with the axe and leaving. The victim survived. Davis's two surviving victims identified him and he gave a full confession. He also confessed to the murder of 13-year-old Duane Bush on June 3, 1971. Bush had been kidnapped, sodomized, and strangled.

Legal proceedings 
Davis was charged with two counts of murder for killing Reed and Lopez and two counts of attempted murder for the assaults on the surviving victims. He was convicted of all of the charges and sentenced to death for the two murders. Davis was also given two consecutive 50-year sentences for the two attempted murders. On December 8, 1993, his sentences for the murder convictions were reduced to 60 years each. All of the sentences ran consecutively, leaving Davis with 220 years to serve in prison. He died in prison on January 22, 2008.

See also
 List of serial killers in the United States

References 

1953 births
2008 deaths
20th-century American criminals
American murderers of children
American people convicted of murder
American people convicted of attempted murder
American prisoners sentenced to death
American rapists
American serial killers
Male serial killers
People convicted of murder by Indiana
Prisoners sentenced to death by Indiana
Violence against men in North America
Prisoners who died in Indiana detention
Serial killers who died in prison custody
Incidents of violence against boys